Venancio Manuel Jesús Novo Cid-Fuentes (born 17 September 1958), known as Nancho Novo,  is a Spanish actor. He studied medicine at Universidad de Santiago de Compostela, but stopped halfway to move to Madrid, where he studied acting at the Real Escuela de Arte Dramático y Danza. He also is a singer, songwriter and guitar player in the rock band Los castigados sin postre.

He is known for his works with Julio Medem.

Select filmography

The Red Squirrel (1993)
All Men Are the Same (1994)
Earth (1995)
Dile a Laura que la quiero (1995)
The Flower of My Secret (1995)
Más que amor, frenesí (1996)
La Celestina (1996)
Finisterre (1998)
Lovers of the Arctic Circle (1998)
Tierra del fuego (2000)
Amor, curiosidad, prozac y dudas (2000)
El lápiz del carpintero (2002)
Astronautas (2003)
Sex (2003)
El año que trafiqué con mujeres (2005)
Sinfín (2005)
Somne (2005)
Hotel Tivoli (2006)
The Pilgrim (2014)

Television 
El club de la comedia
Raquel busca su sitio (series)
La cocinera de Castamar (series)
Blowing Kisses (miniseries)

References

External links
 Official Nancho Novo Site
 

Spanish male singers
Living people
People from A Coruña
University of Santiago de Compostela alumni
Spanish male television actors
Spanish male film actors
Spanish male stage actors
1958 births
20th-century Spanish male actors
21st-century Spanish male actors